The 1988 NC State Wolfpack football team represented North Carolina State University during the 1988 NCAA Division I-A football season. The team's head coach was Dick Sheridan. NC State has been a member of the Atlantic Coast Conference (ACC) since the league's inception in 1953. The Wolfpack played its home games in 1988 at Carter–Finley Stadium in Raleigh, North Carolina, which has been NC State football's home stadium since 1966.

Schedule

Personnel

Game summaries

vs. Iowa (Peach Bowl)

References

NC State
NC State Wolfpack football seasons
NC State Wolfpack football